The 2012 IIHF World Women's U18 Championship was the fifth IIHF World Women's U18 Championships and was hosted in Zlín and Přerov, Czech Republic. It began on December 31, 2011 with the gold medal game played on January 7, 2012.

Canada won the title for the second time after defeating United States 3–0 in the final. Sweden captured the bronze medal with a 4–1 victory over Germany.

With an attendance of 17,480, the tournament set a record for most-attended IIHF U18 World Women's Championship. The previous record holder was the inaugural championship.

Top Division

Preliminary round 
All times are local (UTC+1).

Group A 
All games are being played at Zlín.

Group B 
All games are being played at Přerov.

Relegation round 
The teams played a best-of-three series.

All times are local (UTC+1).

 is relegated to Division I for the 2013 IIHF World Women's U18 Championship.

Final round 

All times are local (UTC+1).

Quarterfinals

Semifinals

Fifth place game

Bronze medal game

Final

Ranking and statistics

Final standings

Scoring leaders
List shows the top skaters sorted by points, then goals. If the list exceeds 10 skaters because of a tie in points, all of the tied skaters are shown.
GP = Games played; G = Goals; A = Assists; Pts = Points; +/− = Plus-minus; PIM = Penalties in minutes; POS = Position
Source: IIHF.com Jan. 7, 2012 (21:15 GMT+1)

Leading goaltenders
Only the top five goaltenders, based on save percentage, who have played 40% of their team's minutes are included in this list.
TOI = Time on ice (minutes:seconds); GA = Goals against; GAA = Goals against average; Sv% = Save percentage; SO = Shutouts
Source: IIHF.com Jan. 7, 2012 (21:15 GMT+1)

Tournament awards
Best players selected by the directorate:
Best Goaltender:  Franziska Albl
Best Defenceman:  Erin Ambrose
Best Forward:  Alex Carpenter
Source: IIHF.com Jan. 7, 2012 (21:17 GMT+1)

Division I

The qualification tournament was played in Asiago, Italy, from 29 November to 4 December 2011. The final tournament was played in Tromsø, Norway, from 29 December 2011 to 4 January 2012.

Qualification tournament

Final tournament

References

External links
Official IIHF website
Official Division I site
Official Division I Qualification site
Official website from the Czech Ice Hockey Association

2012 in ice hockey
World
2011 World Women's
World
2012
December 2011 sports events in Europe
January 2012 sports events in Europe
2011 in Czech women's sport
2012 in Czech women's sport